The 2010 FIA GT3 European Championship season was the fifth season of the FIA GT3 European Championship. The season commenced on 1 May at Silverstone and ended on 10 October at Circuit Zolder. The season featured six double-header rounds, with each race lasting for a duration of 60 minutes. Most of the events were support races to the newly formed FIA GT1 World Championship.

Despite FIA's efforts to slow down the Callaway Competition-entered Chevrolet Corvette of Christian Hohenadel and Daniel Keilwitz via extensive performance balancing, the pairing finished the season as champions, taking four victories to secure the title with a meeting to spare; the second such championship crown for a team running a Corvette after the 2008 triumph of French duo Arnaud Peyroles and James Ruffier. 

The championship-winning margin for Hohenadel and Keilwitz was 46 points over the Prospeed Competition Porsche of Paul van Splunteren and Marco Holzer, who took two wins over the course of the season at Portimão and Zolder. Another Corvette, run by Graff Racing, finished in third place with drivers Joakim Lambotte and Mike Parisy, who won both races at Brno. Four other duos took race victories during the season; Siso Cunill and Tim Bergmeister of Trackspeed won the season-opening race at Silverstone, Kenneth Heyer and Bernd Herdlhofer, and Csaba Walter and Claudia Hürtgen won at Jarama for Team Rosberg and Schubert Motorsport respectively, with the other Schubert Motorsport car of Patrick Söderlund and Edward Sandström winning at Zolder.

Prospeed Competition won the Teams' Championship, but were only confirmed as champions in December following a hearing to the FIA International Court of Appeal. Van Splunteren and Holzer had been disqualified from a victory at Zolder, due to a technical infringement regarding the weight of the car's rear brake discs. 

Ultimately, Prospeed were reinstated which allowed them to regain the teams title which Callaway Competition had assumed from the disqualification. Callaway finished second, ten points behind Prospeed, with Schubert Motorsport finishing third. In the Manufacturers' Cups, the top-two overall placings for Hohenadel and Keilwitz, and van Splunteren and Holzer helped to claim the cups for Corvette and Porsche respectively. The other cup, for Audi drivers, was won by Ireland's Seán Paul Breslin for the German Black Falcon team.

Entries and Drivers
The list below contains the confirmed teams and drivers that competed in the 2010 championship.

Calendar
On 23 October 2009, just before the final round of the 2009 season, the FIA World Motor Sport Council announced the 2010 calendar in co-ordinance with the FIA GT1 World Championship.

Championships
The GT3 Championship adopted the new Formula One points system, meaning points were awarded to the top ten finishers in both races.

Drivers Championship

Teams Championship

Manufacturer's Cups
The Manufacturer Cups were open to any manufacturer who supplied two or more teams in the full season. Points were awarded based on the driver's position within that manufacturer's class.

Audi

Corvette

Porsche

See also
2010 24 Hours of Spa

References

External links

 Official Website of the FIA GT3 European Championship

FIA GT3
FIA GT3
FIA GT3 European Championship